The Genting Group is headquartered in Wisma Genting in Kuala Lumpur, Malaysia. The Group comprises the holding company Genting Berhad, its listed subsidiaries Genting Malaysia Berhad, Genting Plantations Berhad, Genting Singapore Plc, as well as its wholly owned subsidiary Genting Energy Limited.

Founded in 1965 by the late Malaysian entrepreneur Tan Sri Lim Goh Tong, the Genting Group is headed by Tan Sri Lim Kok Thay, the chairman and Chief Executive, who joined the Group in 1976.

The group has developed, operated and marketed casinos and integrated resorts in different parts of the world, including the Americas, Australia, Malaysia, the Philippines, Singapore and the United Kingdom. 
 The Group's pioneer integrated resort is Resorts World Genting, formerly known as Genting Highlands Resort. The main attractions of the resort are its casino, theme park, concert shows, food & beverage and retail shopping.

From its initial leisure and hospitality activities, the Genting Group has expanded and diversified into other activities including plantations, properties, power generation, oil and gas, e-commerce, information technology and biotechnology.

The Group and its affiliates employ about 47,000 people worldwide and have over 4,500 hectares (11,000 acres) of prime resort land and 238,400 hectares (589,099 acres) of land for plantation.

The global tourism, leisure and hospitality and gaming industries were among the sectors hardest hit by the pandemic in 2020 and 2021. For the first time in the Group's history, Genting had to temporarily close all of its resort operations worldwide at intermittent periods, in compliance with respective government directives.

Group structure 
Genting Berhad is principally an investment holding and management company. The company is headquartered in Malaysia. It is listed on the main board of Bursa Malaysia, with a market capitalisation of RM18 billion (about USD4.5 billion) as at 31 December 2021.

 Genting Singapore PLC (52.7% owned by Genting Berhad) – investment holding company. It is listed on Singapore Stock Exchange. Market capitalisation was USD6.91 billion as of 31 December 2021.
 Genting Malaysia Berhad (49.5% owned by Genting Berhad) – It is involved in leisure and hospitality, gambling and entertainment which includes its casino businesses in Malaysia, in the Americas and the United Kingdom. Genting Malaysia owns and operates major properties including Resorts World Genting in Malaysia, Resorts World Casino New York City in the US, over 40 casinos including Resorts World Birmingham in the UK and Resorts World Bimini in the Bahamas. It is listed on the main board of Bursa Malaysia with a market capitalisation of about RM16 billion (USD4 billion) as at 31 December 2021.
 Genting Plantations Berhad (55.4% owned by Genting Berhad) – is involved in plantations, biotechnology and property, which includes its property arm, Genting Property. Genting Plantations owns 243,500 hectares of land in Malaysia and Indonesia. It is listed on the Main Market of Bursa Malaysia with about RM6.0 billion (USD1.5 billion) market capitalisation as of 31 December 2021.
 Kien Huat Realty – the real estate development and investment entity created by Genting founder Lim Goh Tong owns about 43 percent of Genting Berhad.

Diversification and expansion
In December 2006, Genting Group won the bid in obtaining one of two Singapore casino licences to build an integrated resort, named Resorts World Sentosa, under Genting Singapore. The project requirements include hotel, gambling, leisure facilities, convention space and retail.

In 2007, Genting Plantations ventured into biotechnology to develop synthetic genomic processes and naturally occurring processes for alternative energy resources through an equally owned joint venture with "Synthetic Genomics".

In July 2007, Genting Group disposed of its paper and packaging business.

In August 2009, Genting Hong Kong opened Resorts World Manila in partnership with Alliance Global Group. It is one of four groups that won approval in 2008 to build hotels and casinos as part of Philippines' US$20 billion Pagcor City development on Manila Bay. In June 2009, Genting Group supported the capital raising exercise of MGM Mirage.

In August 2010, Genting Property began construction on an upscale retail destination, Johor Premium Outlets in partnership with Jersey-based Simon Property Group, as part of a wider  integrated township project in the southern state of Johor.

In September 2010, Genting New York won a bid to build a racino at Aqueduct Racetrack in New York City, the first step of a planned expansion in the United States. Among the attributes of the plan was providing a diversion for passengers on extended stays at John F. Kennedy International Airport. Resorts World New York opened in October 2011.

In May 2011, Genting Malaysia purchased  of Biscayne Bay front land surrounding the headquarters of The Miami Herald for US$236 million; The McClatchy Company announced that the Herald and El Nuevo Herald would be moving to another location by 2013. The land is to be used for a mixed-use development, Resorts World Miami, that would include hotels, restaurants, residences, retail shops and a convention centre. Genting Group sees the Miami land acquisition as an integral step in its pursuit of expanding internationally in the leisure, hospitality and entertainment industry.

In June 2011, Genting UK was awarded a casino licence for a 55,000 sq-metre mixed-use facility in Birmingham. The development is in partnership with the NEC Group.

In March 2013, Genting bought the site of Echelon Place, an unfinished casino resort on the Las Vegas Strip and announced plans for Resorts World Las Vegas.

In May 2015, Genting Hong Kong purchased 100% ownership of Crystal Cruises and plans for expansion into river cruising, private jet charters using Boeing 777 aircraft and the new build of three 100,000 GT mega cruise ships was announced for the brand. Genting also announced the construction of a 204,000 GT ultra-luxury and giant cruise ship. In October 2016, Genting Hong Kong was entirely sold to the Lim Kok Thay's family-owned unit trust Golden Hope Limited as part of a family business restructuring exercise, separating it from Genting Group but retaining it under ownership of Lim Kok Thay's family.

In 2016, Genting announced the building of Resorts World Miami. This project will cost about US$3 billion. This project has the world's biggest swimming pool.

In 2017, Genting announced they would lend their name to a new resort, Resorts World Catskills. The casino was originally to be named Montreign Resort Casino.

In January 2018, Genting announced plans to build a new casino resort in Andorra. The resort is expected to cost EUR€105 million and will host many different musical and cultural events.

Resort and casino properties

Malaysia
 Resorts World Genting, Genting Highlands, Pahang, Malaysia
 Resorts World Awana (Formerly Awana Genting Highlands Golf & Country Resort), Genting Highlands, Pahang, Malaysia
 Resorts World Kijal, Terengganu, Malaysia
 Resorts World Langkawi, Kedah, Malaysia

United Kingdom

As of December 2010, Genting Malaysia owns the largest number of casinos in the UK, with 46:

 Resorts World Birmingham
 Crockfords Club, London
 The Colony Club, London
 The Palm Beach Casino, London
 Maxims Casino Club, London
 Genting Casino, Bolton
 Genting Casino, Bournemouth
 Genting Casino, Blackpool
 Genting Casino, Brighton
 Genting Casino, Bristol
 Genting Casino, Coventry
 Genting Casino Cromwell Mint, London
 Genting Casino Edgbaston, Birmingham
 Genting Casino, Glasgow, Scotland
 Genting Casino, Leicester
 Genting Casino, Luton
 Genting Casino, Margate
 Genting Casino, Newcastle
 Genting Casino, Nottingham
 Genting Casino, Plymouth
 Genting Casino Renshaw Street, Liverpool
 Genting Casino, Salford
 Genting Casino, Torquay
 Genting Casino York Place, Edinburgh, Scotland
 Genting Chinatown Casino, Birmingham
 Genting Chinatown Casino, London
 Genting Casino Fountainpark, Edinburgh, Scotland
 Genting Casino, Manchester
 Genting Casino Queen Square, Liverpool
 Genting Casino, Reading
 Genting Casino Riverlights, Derby
 Genting Casino, Sheffield
 Genting Casino, Southport
 Genting Casino, Stoke-on-Trent
 Genting Casino Terminus Terrace, Southampton
 Genting Casino, Wirral
 Genting Electric, Luton
 Genting Electric, Portsmouth
 Genting Electric Westcliff, Southend
 Maxims Casino, Southend

Genting owns the Park Lane Mews Hotel in Mayfair, London.

Singapore
 Resorts World Sentosa
Universal Studios Singapore (partner with Universal Studios)
Genting Hotel, Jurong
INEX Innovate Pte Ltd - Medtech Group

Philippines
 Resorts World Manila (in partnership with AGI)
 Resorts World Bayshore City (Under Construction-Part of Entertainment City)

USA and the Caribbean
 Resorts World New York City
 Resorts World Las Vegas
 Resorts World Miami (planned)
 Resorts World Bimini
 Resorts World Catskills (Owned & managed by Empire Resorts, an 88.7% subsidiary)
 Casino of the First Light, (planned)
Resort World Hudson Valley (planned)

China
 Genting Resort Secret Garden

Online Casino
 Genting Casino Online UK
 Genting Casino Spain
 Genting Casino Online Germany
 Genting Casino Online Ireland

Investments in the United States
 Foxwoods Resort Casino, Connecticut (capital loan to the Mashantucket Pequot tribe through Kien Huat Realty)
 Seneca Niagara Casino & Hotel, Niagara Falls, USA (capital loan to Seneca Nation of Indians through Kien Huat Realty)
 Monticello Raceway, Catskills (majority shareholder of Empire Resorts through Kien Huat Realty)
 Massachusetts Region C casino development (financing the development and lobbying expenses behind Wampanoag people Casino of the First Light

Previous properties
 Burswood Entertainment Complex, Perth, Australia (formerly known as Burswood Island Casino)
 Lucayan Beach Resort and Casino, Bahamas (in partnership with the Bahamian government)
 Norwegian Cruise Line, headquartered in Miami. Genting sold their remaining shares in December 2018.
 Genting Hong Kong
Star Cruises
Crystal Cruises
Dream Cruises
MV Werften

Notes

External links

 

1965 establishments in Malaysia
Companies based in Kuala Lumpur
Conglomerate companies established in 1965
Malaysian companies established in 1965
Companies listed on Bursa Malaysia
Genting Highlands
Gambling companies of Malaysia
Resorts World Sentosa
Conglomerate companies of Malaysia
Multinational companies headquartered in Malaysia
Malaysian brands